The Canadian Screen Award for Best Actor in Comedy Series is an annual Canadian television award, presented by the Academy of Canadian Cinema and Television to the best leading performance by an actor in a Canadian television comedy series.

The award was first presented in 1986 as part of the Gemini Awards. However, as Canadian television comedy was dominated by sketch comedy rather than narrative sitcoms in the late 1980s, the awards for Best Actor and Best Actress in a Comedy Series were discontinued after 1987, with only a single gender-neutral award presented for Best Performance in a Comedy thereafter; separate awards for Individual Performance in a Comedy and Ensemble Performance in a Comedy were introduced for the 16th Gemini Awards in 2001, but were still not separated for gender.

With the revival of scripted narrative comedy series in the 2000s, separate awards for actors and actresses were reinstated in 2011, and have been presented since then as part of the Canadian Screen Awards.

In August 2022, the Academy announced that beginning with the 11th Canadian Screen Awards in 2023, a gender-neutral award for Best Leading Performance in a Comedy Series will be presented.

1980s

2010s

2020s

References

Best Actor, Comedy Series